The Senior League World Series (SLWS) Southeast and Southwest regions are two of five United States regions that currently send teams to the Senior League World Series in Easley, South Carolina. The former South Region's participation in the SLWS dated back to 1962, until the region was divided in 2002.

South Region States
In 2002 the region was split in half.

Southeast

 Georgia

Southwest

 (East)
 (West)

Region Champions
As of the 2001 Senior League World Series.

South Region Champions

Results by State

Southeast Region Champions

Southwest Region Champions

Results by State
As of the 2022 Senior League World Series.

See also
South Region in other Little League divisions
Little League – South 1957-2000
Little League – Southeast
Little League – Southwest
Intermediate League
Junior League
Big League

References

+South
Defunct Little League baseball regions
Defunct baseball competitions in the United States
1962 establishments in the United States
2002 disestablishments in the United States